The 2019 European Motocross Championship was the 31st European Motocross Championship season since it was revived in 1988. It included 15 events and 5 different classes. It started at Matterley Basin in Great Britain on 24 March, and ended at Imola in Italy on 22 September. All rounds acted as support classes at the European rounds of the 2019 MXGP.

EMX250
A 9-round calendar for the 2019 season was announced on 25 October 2018.
EMX250 is for riders competing on 4-stroke motorcycles between 175cc-250cc.
For 2019, an age restriction has been placed on the class, meaning only riders under the age of 23 are allowed to compete.

EMX250

Entry list

Riders Championship

Manufacturers Championship

EMX125
An 8-round calendar for the 2019 season was announced on 25 October 2018.
EMX125 is for riders competing on 2-stroke motorcycles of 125cc.

EMX125

Entry list

Riders Championship

Manufacturers Championship

EMX2T
A 7-round calendar for the 2019 season was announced on 25 October 2018.
EMX2T is for riders competing on 2-stroke motorcycles of 250cc.

EMX2T

Entry list

Riders Championship

Manufacturers Championship

EMX85
A 1-round calendar for the 2019 season was announced on 25 October 2018.
EMX85 is for riders competing on 2-stroke motorcycles of 85cc.

EMX85

Participants
Riders qualify for the championship by finishing in the top 10 in one of the 4 regional 85cc championships.

Riders Championship

EMX65
A 1-round calendar for the 2019 season was announced on 25 October 2018.
EMX65 is for riders competing on 2-stroke motorcycles of 65cc.

EMX65

Participants
Riders qualify for the championship by finishing in the top 10 in one of the 4 regional 65cc championships.

Riders Championship

References 

European Motocross Championship
European Motocross
Motocross